Alexander S. Forbes was a Scottish professional footballer. He played for Luton Town, Bournemouth and Gillingham between 1928 and 1935, making over 100 appearances in the English Football League.

References

Year of birth missing
Year of death missing
Scottish footballers
Gillingham F.C. players
Luton Town F.C. players
AFC Bournemouth players
People from Bo'ness
Footballers from Falkirk (council area)
Association footballers not categorized by position